Romualdas Brazauskas (born July 31, 1960 in Biržai) is a Lithuanian basketball referee. After graduation from Vilnius Pedagogical Institute in 1983, Brazauskas became a FIBA judge in 1987 and since then he has judged basketball games in the Olympics, FIBA European and World Championships, Euroleague (including ten final games). In 2010, Brazauskas was awarded a Golden Whistle by FIBA at the World Championship in Turkey becoming a second person in history to receive this honorary award.

He is the chief judge at the Lithuanian Women's Basketball League, member of the Executive Committee of the Lithuanian Basketball Judge Association Executive Committee, and director of the Lithuanian Basketball League.

Major championships
Major championships, which he refereed:

 1995 Eurobasket, Athens
 1997 EuroBasket, Barcelona
 1999 Eurobasket, Paris
 2001 EuroBasket, Istanbul
 2009 EuroBasket, Poland (including the finals)
 1998 Goodwill Games, New York
 1998 FIBA World Championship, Athens,
 2002 FIBA World Championship, Indianapolis
 2006 FIBA World Championship, Saitama
 2010 FIBA World Championship, Istanbul
 1992 Summer Olympics, Barcelona
 1996 Summer Olympics, Atlanta (including women tournament's final)
 2000 Summer Olympics, Sydney (including men tournament's final)
 2008 Summer Olympics, Beijing (including men tournament's final)

References

 Romualdas Brazauskas. Visuotinė lietuvių enciklopedija, T. III (Beketeriai-Chakasai). V.: Mokslo ir enciklopedijų leidybos institutas, 2003, p. 439
 info.lt Pristatytas naujas SEB BBL sezonas

1960 births
Living people
Lithuanian basketball referees
People from Biržai
Lithuanian University of Educational Sciences alumni